Benjamin Scott Harding (born 6 September 1984) is an English professional footballer who plays for as a midfielder Truro City.

Club career

Wimbledon and Milton Keynes Dons
Harding began his career at Wimbledon and signed terms with them in October 2001. He made his debut in November 2003, and made 42 league appearances before signing a new two-year deal in August 2005. In November 2005, Harding was loaned to Forest Green Rovers for two months. Injuries limited him to just 10 appearances for the now renamed MK Dons over the remainder of the 2005–6 season.

The following season, Harding was loaned out to the Conference National sides Aldershot Town and Grays Athletic. At the end of the season he was released by the MK Dons and he returned to Aldershot Town as a trialist.

Aldershot Town
Harding impressed in the trials and signed a contract in August 2007. He was an ever-present and instrumental player in the 2007–08 league campaign, as Aldershot Town won the Conference National title and the Conference League Cup. He was also one of five Aldershot Town players, that were named in the Conference Select XI Team of the Year. At the end of the season, Harding signed a new two-year contract, which would keep him at the Recreation Ground until the end of the 2009–10 season.

Harding made his 100th appearance for Aldershot Town in the home game against Wycombe Wanderers in December 2008. He tore an achilles in February 2009, which sidelined him for the remainder of season.

Wycombe Wanderers
On 23 May 2011, Harding signed a two-year contract with recently promoted League One side Wycombe Wanderers.

Northampton Town
After a month on loan at Sixfields, Harding joined Northampton Town, permanently signing an 18-month deal on deadline day.

Torquay United
On 13 July 2013, Harding signed for Torquay United on a two-year contract, becoming Alan Knill's fifth signing of the summer.

Truro City
On 28 July 2017, Harding signed for Truro City on a one-year contract, becoming Lee Hodges's second signing of the summer after Ben Gerring's release from Torquay United. On 8 August 2018, Harding was appointed interim manager of Truro, following Lee Hodges' resignation.

International career
Harding's performances at Aldershot Town gained him an England C call up and debut in February 2008. Harding was also part of the England C squad, that won the Four Nations Tournament in May 2008.

Honours
Aldershot Town
Conference National: 2008
Conference League Cup: 2008

England C
Four Nations Tournament: 2008

References

External links

1984 births
Living people
Footballers from Carshalton
English footballers
England semi-pro international footballers
Association football midfielders
Wycombe Wanderers F.C. players
Aldershot Town F.C. players
Forest Green Rovers F.C. players
Grays Athletic F.C. players
Milton Keynes Dons F.C. players
Wimbledon F.C. players
Northampton Town F.C. players
Torquay United F.C. players
Gosport Borough F.C. players
Truro City F.C. players
Truro City F.C. managers
English Football League players
National League (English football) players
English football managers